Koreocobitis is a small genus of loaches endemic to the Korean Peninsula.

Species
There are currently two recognized species in this genus:
 Koreocobitis naktongensis I. S. Kim, J. Y. Park & Nalbant, 2000
 Koreocobitis rotundicaudata (Wakiya & T. Mori, 1929) (White nose loach)

References

Cobitidae
Ray-finned fish genera
Freshwater fish genera
Taxa named by Ik-Soo Kim
Taxa named by Teodor T. Nalbant